David Ernest James Ironside (2 May 1925 – 21 August 2005) was a South African cricketer who played in three Test matches, all against New Zealand in South Africa in 1953–54. On his debut, he took five wickets in the first innings against New Zealand in Johannesburg in 1953.

An accurate right-arm swing bowler, he played for Transvaal from 1947–48 to 1955–56. His best figures were 7 for 36 against Border in 1952–53.

See also
 List of South Africa cricketers who have taken five-wicket hauls on Test debut
 List of Test cricketers born in non-Test playing nations

References

External links

1925 births
2005 deaths
South Africa Test cricketers
South African cricketers
Gauteng cricketers
Cricketers who have taken five wickets on Test debut